The 2004 Grand Prix Hassan II was an Association of Tennis Professionals tennis tournament held in Casablanca, Morocco. It was the 20th edition of the tournament and was held from May 17 to May 24.

Finals

Singles

 Santiago Ventura defeated  Dominik Hrbatý 6–3, 1–6, 6–4
 It was Ventura's only title of the year and the 1st of his career.

Doubles

 Enzo Artoni /  Fernando Vicente defeated  Yves Allegro /  Michael Kohlmann 3–6, 6–0, 6–4
 It was Artoni's only title of the year and the 2nd of his career. It was Vicente's only title of the year and the 4th of his career.

External links
 ATP tournament profile

 
Grand Prix Hassan II
Grand Prix Hassan II